The fifth season of Numbers, an American television series, first aired on October 3, 2008 and ended on May 15, 2009. The season premiere was moved back one week as a result of the presidential debates.

Season five opens three weeks after the fourth season's finale, "When Worlds Collide", with the government dropping the charges against Charlie. Charlie gets his security clearance back after he and Don fight FBI Security Officer Carl McGowan. Don begins to explore Judaism. The team adds new agent Nikki Betancourt, arriving shortly after Megan Reeve's departure. Liz receives a promotion but turns it down. Buck Winters (from "Spree" and "Two Daughters") breaks out of prison and comes after Don. Alan suddenly finds himself coaching CalSci's basketball team. David becomes Don's primary relief supervisor. DARPA tries to recruit Charlie, but he turns down their offer. Toward the end of the season, Don is stabbed, and Charlie blames himself for it. The aftermath of Don's stabbing causes Charlie to focus more on his FBI consultation work. Amita is kidnapped, and the team race to find her. After she is rescued, Charlie proposes to Amita. Her response is unknown.

Cast

Main 
 Rob Morrow as Don Eppes
 David Krumholtz as Charlie Eppes
 Judd Hirsch as Alan Eppes
 Alimi Ballard as David Sinclair
 Peter MacNicol as Larry Fleinhardt
 Navi Rawat as Amita Ramanujan
 Dylan Bruno as Colby Granger
 Aya Sumika as Liz Warner
 Sophina Brown as Nikki Betancourt

Recurring 
 Lou Diamond Phillips as Agent Ian Edgerton
 Michelle Nolden as AUSA Robin Brooks
 Leslie Silva as M.E. Ridenhour

Guest

Episodes

References 
NOTE: Refs Need Archive Backup URLs @ https://archive.org/web/

External links 
 

5
5
2008 American television seasons
2009 American television seasons